Scythris pretoriensis is a moth of the family Scythrididae. It was described by Bengt Å. Bengtsson in 2014. It is found in South Africa (Gauteng). Since its discovery, there have been 164 observations of S. pretoriensis moths.

References

Endemic moths of South Africa
pretoriensis
Moths described in 2014
Moths of Africa